{{DISPLAYTITLE:C4H8O}}
The molecular formula C4H8O may refer to:

 Butanone
 Butyraldehyde
 Crotyl alcohol
 Cyclobutanol
 1,2-Epoxybutane
 2,3-Epoxybutane
 Ethyl vinyl ether
 Isobutyraldehyde
 2-Methoxypropene
 Tetrahydrofuran